Tempest is the surname of:

 Tempest family, a recusant family of northern England in the 16th and 17th centuries
 Annie Tempest (born 1959), British artist and cartoonist known for the comic strip The Yuppies
 Billy Tempest (1893–1945), English footballer
 Dale Tempest (born 1963), English former footballer
 Edmund Tempest (1894–1921), British First World War flying ace
Florence Tempest (1889 – after January 1932), American comedian and dancer
 Gerard Francis Tempest (1918–2009), American painter, sculptor and architect
 Greg Tempest (born 1993), English footballer
 Joey Tempest (born 1963), Swedish rock musician
 John Tempest (disambiguation), various British Members of Parliament
 Kae Tempest (born 1985), English poet and spoken word artist
 Margaret Tempest (1892–1982), English author and artist, best known for illustrating the Little Grey Rabbit books
 Marie Tempest (1864–1942), English singer and actress
 Pierce Tempest (1653–1717), English book and print seller
 Robert Tempest, High Sheriff of Durham 1558–1562
 William Tempest (born 1987), British fashion designer
 William Tempest (politician) (1653–1700), English Member of Parliament